= Malmö FF (disambiguation) =

Malmö FF is a Swedish football club and former sports club in Malmö.

Malmö FF may also refer to:

- Malmö Redhawks – formerly known as Malmö FF Hockey
- FC Rosengård – formerly known as Malmö FF Dam
